Ivy + Bean is a children's book series written by American author Annie Barrows, illustrated by Sophie Blackall, and published by Chronicle Books.

Description
In the stories,  Ivy, a quiet intellectual girl, and Bean, a rambunctious wild girl, become fast friends despite their differences and initial reluctance to like each other. The series tagline sums up the series as "two friends who never meant to like each other." They are both seven year old girls who live on the  cul-de-sac 
of Pancake Court which is set in an   unmentioned town. In each book, they get into considerable mischief and have wild adventures with the other characters in the neighborhood.

The books feature illustrations, but are not picture books.  The reading level is suitable for grades three and above. As of 2021, there are twelve books in the series.

Books
The books in the series are:
Ivy + Bean (April 2006)
Ivy + Bean and the Ghost That Had to Go (October 2006)
Ivy + Bean Break the Fossil Record (August 2007)
Ivy + Bean Take Care of the Babysitter (2007)
Ivy + Bean: Bound to Be Bad (October 2008)
Ivy + Bean: Doomed to Dance (September 2009)
Ivy + Bean: What’s the Big Idea? (September 2010)
Ivy + Bean: No News Is Good News (September 2011)
Ivy + Bean Make the Rules (September 2011)
Ivy + Bean Take the Case (September 2013)
Ivy + Bean: One Big Happy Family (August 2018)
Ivy + Bean: Get To Work! (April 2021)

Adaptations

The books were planned to have an animated series that would have aired on Universal Kids but the series ended up in development hell and Universal Kids eventually ceased developing original content in 2019.

Netflix adapted the books into a live-action feature film. Jesse Tyler Ferguson, Jane Lynch, Sasha Pieterse, Nia Vardalos, Jaycie Dotin, Garfield Wilson, and Marci T. House star in the film. It was released on September 2, 2022.

References

External links

Annie Barrows' Website
Sophie Blackall's Website
http://www.ew.com/article/2012/10/11/ivy-and-bean-annie-barrows-sophie-blackall
 http://www.sfgate.com/books/article/Annie-Barrows-Ivy-Bean-books-lauded-3943400.php

American children's novels
American children's book series
Illustrated books
2006 children's books